Regeneration is the seventh studio album by Irish chamber pop band the Divine Comedy, released in 2001 by Parlophone/EMI (their first for the label). Three singles were released from the album: "Love What You Do", "Bad Ambassador" and "Perfect Lovesong", the latter failing to make the top 40.

Production
Produced by Nigel Godrich, known for his work with Radiohead, this album is distinctly different from frontman Neil Hannon's other work and was darker in tone than what the Divine Comedy's listeners had come to expect. It eschewed the orchestral-driven chamber pop the band was known for in favor of a more stripped down, guitar-focused style, slightly reminiscent of the band's debut album Fanfare for the Comic Muse. It is a more group-concentrated effort, hence the more organic sound.

Track listing

Personnel
Personnel adapted from liner notes included in Venus, Cupid, Folly & Time - Thirty Years of the Divine Comedy.

Musicians
Neil Hannon - vocals, guitar, additional keyboards
Miggy Barradas - drums, percussion
Stuart 'Pinkie' Bates - organ, synthesizer, recorder
Rob Farrer - percussion, additional drums
Bryan Mills - bass, additional guitar
Ivor Talbot - guitar, additional bass
Joby Talbot - piano, synthesizer, recorder, string arrangements
Philip Sheppard - cello (track 3)
Millennia Strings - strings (tracks 2, 5, 9 and 11)
London TeleFilmonic Orchestra - various (track 4)

Production
Nigel Godrich - producer
Dan Grech-Marguerat - recording assistant
Gerard Navarro - mixing assistant
Claire Burbridge - art direction and sculptures
Harry Borden - photography
Duncan Smith - additional photography

References

2001 albums
The Divine Comedy (band) albums
Parlophone albums
Albums produced by Nigel Godrich